

History
The program (Deving Durgatiharinim) was first aired by All India Radio on 23 September 1976 on the holy day of Mahalaya. It replaced the long running program Mahishasura Mardini narrated by Birendra Krishna Bhadra. It was dubbed as a "revamp", replacing Bhadra as the narrator by legendary Bengali film star Uttam Kumar, and Pankaj Mullick was replaced by Hemanta Mukherjee as the music director for the program.

The new program (Deving Durgatiharinim), however, was a huge flop, and was criticized a lot by the listeners. Such was the backlash that AIR decided to issue a public apology and continue broadcasting the one narrated by Bhadra on Mahalaya. The new program was there after scheduled to be aired every year on the day of Durga Mahasashthi (seven days after Mahalaya).

References

All India Radio
Indian radio programmes